is a Japanese manga series written by Yukari Koyama and illustrated by Eliza Kusakabe. It was serialized online in DeNA's Manga Box app in multiple languages since September 2014 and published in print by Kodansha in five volumes. An 8-episode live-action drama adaptation aired on TV Asahi from January 26 to March 16, 2018, and a 20-episode original net animation adaptation premiered on Production I.G's Anime Beans app on August 3, 2018.

References

External links
Holiday Love (manga) at Kodansha 
Holiday Love (drama) at TV Asahi 
Holiday Love (drama) Side story 1 at AbemaTV 
Holiday Love (drama) Side story 2  at AbemaTV 

2018 Japanese television series debuts
2018 Japanese television series endings
2018 anime ONAs
Anime series based on manga
Japanese webcomics
Josei manga
Kodansha manga
Manga adapted into television series
Production I.G
TV Asahi television dramas
Webcomics in print